Rachel, Lady Redgrave (28 May 1910 – 24 May 2003), known primarily by her birth name Rachel Kempson, was an English actress. She married Sir Michael Redgrave, and was the matriarch of the famous acting dynasty.

Career
Kempson trained at RADA before joining the Royal Shakespeare Company. She married Michael Redgrave in 1935 and the couple appeared together many times on stage. She also appeared many times on film and television, most notably in the films The Captive Heart, The Sea Shall Not Have Them (both opposite her husband Michael), The Jokers, Two Gentlemen Sharing, Out of Africa, Uncle Vanya, and the television series Jennie: Lady Randolph Churchill (1974) and The Jewel in the Crown. She made three films with her daughter Lynn (Tom Jones, Georgy Girl and The Virgin Soldiers), and two films with her other daughter Vanessa (The Charge of the Light Brigade – which also starred her son Corin – and Déjà Vu). Her 1986 autobiography, Life Among the Redgraves was published by Dutton. According to Publishers Weekly, "Lady Redgrave writes with candour, wit, restraint and some sadness about her background, beginnings in the theatre in 1932, marriage and motherhood, the trials of moving and the problems of being married to a handsome matinee idol."

Personal life

Kempson was born in Dartmouth, Devon, the daughter of Beatrice Hamilton (née Ashwell) and Eric William Edward Kempson, a headmaster.

Kempson married fellow actor Michael Redgrave in 1935, and became the daughter-in-law of Roy Redgrave and Margaret Scudamore. Kempson was the mother of Vanessa (born 1937), Corin (1939–2010) and Lynn Redgrave (1943–2010) and the grandmother of Joely and Natasha Richardson (1963–2009), Jemma Redgrave, Luke Redgrave, Arden Redgrave, Harvey Redgrave, Carlo Gabriel Nero, Benjamin B. Clark, Kelly B. Clark and Annabel Lucy Clark.

In 1959, her husband was knighted and she formally became  Lady Redgrave. However, she refused to use her title  professionally. In 2003, four days before what would have been her 93rd birthday, she died of a stroke at the home of her granddaughter, Natasha Richardson, in Millbrook, New York. Richardson died on 18 March 2009 in a skiing accident and was buried near Kempson. Kempson's youngest daughter, Lynn Redgrave, was buried in the same cemetery on 8 May 2010, near Kempson and Richardson.

Filmography

References

External links

 Rachel Kempson interview on BBC Radio 4 Desert Island Discs, 5 May 1989

1910 births
2003 deaths
British expatriates in the United States
20th-century English actresses
Alumni of RADA
English film actresses
English stage actresses
English television actresses
People from Dartmouth, Devon
Royal Shakespeare Company members
Actresses from Devon
Redgrave family
Wives of knights